Vikerkaar ('rainbow' in Estonian) is an Estonian magazine published in Tallinn, Estonia by Kultuurileht SA. The magazine focuses on Estonian literature.

First number was issued in 1986.

1986-2006 was also issued Russian version of Vikerkaar. The magazine was called Радуга.

References

Magazines published in Estonia
Estonian literature